Danilo is a given name found in Italian, Portuguese, Spanish and Serbian.

Notable people with the name Danilo include:

Athletes

Footballers
 Danilo (footballer, born 1979), Brazilian footballer Danilo de Andrade
 Danilo (footballer, born 1980), Brazilian footballer Danilo Moreira Serrano
 Danilo (footballer, born 1981), Brazilian footballer Danilo Aguiar Rocha
 Danilo (footballer, born 1984), Brazilian footballer Danilo Larangeira
 Danilo (footballer, born 1986), Brazilian footballer Danilo Vitalino Pereira
 Danilo (footballer, born 1990), Belgian footballer Richard Danilo Maciel Sousa Campos
 Danilo (footballer, born April 1991), Brazilian footballer Danilo Lopes Cezario
 Danilo (footballer, born July 1991), Brazilian footballer Danilo Luiz da Silva
 Danilo (footballer, born 1999), Brazilian footballer Danilo Pereira da Silva
 Danilo (footballer, born 2001), Brazilian footballer Danilo dos Santos de Oliveira
 Danilo Aceval (born 1975), Paraguayan footballer
 Danilo Acosta (born 1997), Ecuadorian footballer
 Danilo Alves (footballer, born 1996) (born 1996), Brazilian footballer
 Danilo Alvim (1920–1996), Brazilian footballer
 Danilo Arboleda (born 1995), Colombian footballer
 Danilo Arrieta (born 1987), Chilean-Danish footballer
 Danilo Barbosa (born 1996), Brazilian footballer
 Danilo Barcelos (born 1991), Brazilian footballer
 Danilo Cintra (born 1985), Brazilian footballer
 Danilo Cirino (born 1986), Brazilian footballer
 Danilo Clementino (born 1982), naturalized Equatoguinean footballer
 Danilo Dias (born 1985), Brazilian footballer
 Danilo Pantić (born 1996), Serbian footballer
 Danilo Pereira (born 1991), Portuguese footballer
 Danilo Quipapá (born 1994), Brazilian footballer
 Danilo Silva (born 1986), Brazilian footballer
 Danilinho (footballer, born 1985), Brazilian footballer Danilo Caçador (1985–2018)
 Danilinho (footballer, born 1987), Brazilian footballer Danilo Veron Bairros

Other athletes
 Danilo Anđušić (born 1991), Serbian basketball player
 Danilo Gallinari (born 1988), Italian basketball player
 Danilo Ikodinović (born 1976), Serbian water polo player

Artists and entertainers
 Danilo Arona (active since 1994), Italian writer
 Danilo Bach (born 1944), American screenwriter and film producer
 Danilo Bertazzi (born 1966), Italian actor
 Danilo De Girolamo (1956–2012), Italian voice actor
 Danilo Donati (1926–2001), Italian costume designer
 Danilo Gentili (born 1979), Brazilian reporter and comedian
 Danilo Kiš (1935–1989), Yugoslav novelist
 Danilo Kocevski (born 1947), Macedonian writer
 Danilo Lazović (1951–2006), Serbian actor
 Danilo Pennone (born 1963), Italian writer
 Danilo Pérez (born 1965), Panamanian jazz pianist and composer
 Danilo Šerbedžija (born 1971), Serbian film director
 Danilo Stojković (1934–2002), Serbian actor

Politicians, government officials and revolutionaries
 Danilo Anderson (1966–2004), assassinated Venezuelan environmental state prosecutor
 Danilo Astori (born 1940), Uruguayan politician
 Danilo Golubović (born 1963), Serbian politician
 Danilo Ilić (1891–1915), Serbian revolutionary
 Danilo Medina (born 1951), President of the Dominican Republic since 2012
 Danilo Lim (1955–2021), Filipino army general and government administrator

Religious leaders
 Danilo I, Serbian Archbishop
 Danilo I, Metropolitan of Cetinje (1670–1735)
 Danilo II (Archbishop of Serbs), primate of the Serbian Orthodox Church (1324–1337)
 Danilo II, Metropolitan of Montenegro, in office (1961–1990)
 Danilo III (patriarch) (c. 1350–1400), Patriarch of the Serbian Orthodox Church, writer and poet

Other people
 Danilo I, Prince of Montenegro (1826–1860), Prince of Montenegro
 Danilo, Crown Prince of Montenegro (1871–1939), crown prince of Montenegro
 Danilo Atienza (active 1974–1989), Filipino pilot
 Danilo Blanuša (1903–1987), Yugoslavian mathematician and physicist
 Danilo Concepcion (born 1958), Filipino lawyer and current president of the University of the Philippines

See also
Danilo (surname)
Danylo (given name)
Danillo, a given name
Danilović, a surname
Danilov (surname)
Danilovsky (surname)
Danilovo
Danilo culture, Neolithic archaeological culture of prehistoric Croatia

D
D
D
D
D
D